Marcos Chinea (born 12 June 1950) is a Spanish boxer. He competed in the men's lightweight event at the 1968 Summer Olympics. At the 1968 Summer Olympics, he lost to Jonathan Dele of Nigeria.

References

1950 births
Living people
Spanish male boxers
Olympic boxers of Spain
Boxers at the 1968 Summer Olympics
People from La Gomera
Sportspeople from the Province of Santa Cruz de Tenerife
Lightweight boxers